Guima is a nick name, short for Guimarães. It may refer to:

 Guima (footballer, born 1986), Bruno Guimarães Pinho de Azevedo, Portuguese football striker
 Guima (footballer, born 1995), Ricardo Martins Guimarães, Portuguese football midfielder for Chaves